Tagalog alphabet may refer to:

 Abakada alphabet, indigenized Latin alphabet of the Tagalog language
 Filipino alphabet, standardized version of the Abakada alphabet, used in the Filipino language
 Baybayin, ancient Philippine script
 Tagalog (Unicode block), Unicode block containing Baybayin characters